is a junction passenger railway station located in the city of Kodaira, Tokyo, Japan, operated by the private railway operator Seibu Railway.

Lines
It is located 2.7 km from the starting point of the Kokubunji Line at Higashi-Murayama, and 2.8 km from the start of the Haijima Line at Kodaira.

Station layout
The station consists of two ground-level island platforms serving four tracks. The station building is located above the platforms, with entrances on the east and west sides.

Platforms

History
Ogawa Station opened on 21 December 1894.

Station numbering was introduced on all Seibu Railway lines during fiscal 2012, with Ogawa Station becoming "SS31" on the Haijima Line and "SK04" on the Kokubunji Line.

Passenger statistics
In fiscal 2019, the station was the 34th busiest on the Seibu network with an average of 29,859 passengers daily. 

The passenger figures for previous years are as shown below.

Surrounding area
 Polytechnic University

References

External links

 Seibu station information 

Stations of Seibu Railway
Seibu Haijima Line
Seibu Kokubunji Line
Kodaira, Tokyo
Railway stations in Tokyo
Railway stations in Japan opened in 1894